The Little Iowa River is a  tributary of the Upper Iowa River in southeastern Minnesota.

See also
List of rivers of Minnesota

References

Rivers of Minnesota